Isabel Tocino Biscarolasaga (born in Santander, Spain on 9 March 1949) is a Spanish politician.

Life and career
Tocino is a professor at Complutense University of Madrid. She served as Minister of Environment in the government of Prime Minister José María Aznar from 1996 until 2000.

Tocino is a member of Opus Dei.

Other activities
 Banco Pastor, Chairwoman of the Board of Directors (since 2017)
 Amundi, Member of the Global Advisory Board (since 2016)
 Enagás, Independent Member of the Board of Directors (2015–2022)
 ENCE Energía y Celulosa, Independent External Member of the Board of Directors
 Naturhouse Health, Independent Member of the Board of Directors (since 2014)
 Banco Santander, Non-Executive Independent Member of the Board of Directors (2007-2017)
 Climate Change Capital, Non-Executive Member of the Board of Directors (-2015)
 Banif Financial Group, Member of the Board of Directors (2006-2015)

References 

Politicians from Cantabria
Members of the 3rd Congress of Deputies (Spain)
Members of the 4th Congress of Deputies (Spain)
Members of the 5th Congress of Deputies (Spain)
Members of the 6th Congress of Deputies (Spain)
Environment ministers of Spain
People's Party (Spain) politicians
Complutense University of Madrid
Opus Dei members
People from Santander, Spain
1949 births
Living people
Women government ministers of Spain
Members of the Board of Directors of the Banco Santander
20th-century Spanish women politicians